CD-104 or No. 104 was a Type D escort ship of the Imperial Japanese Navy during World War II and later the Republic of China Navy.

History
She was laid down on 1 September 1944 at the Nagasaki shipyard of Mitsubishi Heavy Industries for the benefit of the Imperial Japanese Navy and launched on 16 December 1944. On 31 January 1945, she was completed and commissioned. On 15 March 1945, she was assigned to the First Escort Fleet and then reassigned on 10 April 1945 to the Seventh Fleet. On 15 August 1945, Japan announced their unconditional surrender. On 30 November 1945, she was struck from the Navy List. On 1 December 1945, she was assigned to the Allied Occupation Force where she served as a minesweeper. 

On 29 August 1947, she was ceded to the Republic of China as a war reparation and renamed Tai An (泰安).

References

Bibliography

1944 ships
Type D escort ships
Ships built by Mitsubishi Heavy Industries
Ships of the Republic of China Navy